Julian A. Dowdeswell (born 18 November 1957) is a British glaciologist and a Professor of Physical Geography in the Department of Geography at the University of Cambridge, and from 2002-2021 was the Director of the Scott Polar Research Institute.

Education
Dowdeswell graduated with a BA in geography from the University of Cambridge in 1980, and studied for a master's degree at INSTAAR in the University of Colorado and for a Ph.D. in the Scott Polar Research Institute.

Career
He started his career as a lecturer in Physical Geography at the University of Wales, Aberystwyth. He subsequently went on to work as a Professor of Physical Geography and Director of the Bristol Glaciology Centre, University of Bristol and then to the University of Cambridge in 2001. He became the director of the Scott Polar Research Institute in 2002. He is also a professorial fellow at Jesus College, Cambridge.

His research focuses on the form and flow of glaciers and ice caps and their response to climate change, and the links between former ice sheets and the marine geological record, using a variety of satellite, airborne and shipborne geophysical tools.

In 2019 Professor Dowdeswell was Chief Scientist on the Weddell Sea Expedition 2019, which aimed to:
investigate the ice shelves around the Weddell Sea and, in particular, the Larsen C Ice Shelf from which a giant iceberg broke off in July 2017
document the rich and little-studied marine life of the western Weddell Sea ecosystem
attempt to locate and survey the wreck of Sir Ernest Shackleton’s ship ‘Endurance’, which was trapped and crushed by the ice and sank in the Weddell Sea in 1915.

Awards
Polar Medal (1994) by H.M. The Queen for 'outstanding contributions to glacier geophysics'.
Gill Memorial Award (1998) from the Royal Geographical Society.
Founder's Medal (2008) from the Royal Geographical Society.
Louis Agassiz Medal (2011) from the European Geosciences Union for 'outstanding contributions to the study of polar ice masses and to the understanding of the processes and patterns of sedimentation in glacier-influenced marine environments'.
IASC Medal (2014) by the International Arctic Science Committee.
Lyell Medal (2018) from the Geological Society of London

References

1957 births
Living people
British glaciologists
Academics of the University of Cambridge
Fellows of Jesus College, Cambridge
British geographers
Recipients of the Polar Medal
People educated at Magdalen College School, Oxford
Alumni of Jesus College, Cambridge
University of Colorado alumni
Academics of Aberystwyth University
Lyell Medal winners
People of the Scott Polar Research Institute
Recipients of the Royal Geographical Society Founder's Medal